Micaela Kelly (born July 2, 1998) is an American professional basketball player. She was picked in the second round of the 2021 WNBA draft by the Connecticut Sun of the Women's National Basketball Association.

Early life
Kelly was born in Detroit, Michigan. She played basketball for Detroit King High School. She was named to the All-Detroit High School Girls Basketball first team in 2016.

College career
Kelly attended Central Michigan University. She led CMU to a Mid-American Conference title and an NCAA tournament berth. She is the second player in program history in terms of points with 2,173. She was an MAC Player of the Year in 2019–20. Her senior year, she averaged 23.9 points and 4.9 assists. She graduates in 2021 with a degree in community development.

Professional career
Kelly announced in March 2021 that she would forgo a year of eligibility to declare for the WNBA Draft. She is the second player from Central Michigan to be selected.

After starting the season with Antalya Gunesi in Turkey, Kelly signed with Breiðablik of the Icelandic Úrvalsdeild in November 2021, replacing Chelsey Shumpert.

The Indiana Fever announced on February 19, 2022, that they have signed Kelly to a Training Camp Contract  She was waived by the Fever on 20 April.

Statistics

College statistics

Source

References

External links
Profile at Eurobasket.com

1998 births
Living people
American women's basketball players
Basketball players from Detroit
Breiðablik women's basketball players
Central Michigan Chippewas women's basketball players
Connecticut Sun draft picks
Guards (basketball)
Úrvalsdeild kvenna basketball players